Hengam-e Qadim (also Romanized as Hengām-e Qadīm; also known as Hengām-e Kohneh, Hengām-e Qadīd, Hengam Kohneh, and Khammāsī) is a village in Hengam Rural District, Shahab District, Qeshm County, Hormozgan Province, Iran. At the 2006 census, its population was 48, in 12 families.  The village is located on Hengam Island.

References 

Populated places in Qeshm County